Duerotherium is an extinct genus of anoplotheriine artiodactyl which existed in Iberian Peninsula during the middle Eocene. It was first named by Miguel-Ángel Cuesta and Ainara Badiola in 2009 and the type species is Duerotherium sudrei.

References

Tylopoda
Eocene even-toed ungulates
Fossil taxa described in 2009
Eocene mammals of Europe
Prehistoric even-toed ungulate genera